Wilds Nunatak is a lone nunatak located 2 nautical miles (3.7 km) west of the south end of Frontier Mountain in Victoria Land. Mapped by United States Geological Survey (USGS) from surveys and U.S. Navy air photos, 1960–64. Named by Advisory Committee on Antarctic Names (US-ACAN) for Ronald F. Wilds, aviation machinist's mate with U.S. Navy Squadron VX-6 at McMurdo Station, 1966.

Nunataks of Victoria Land
Pennell Coast